Juan Luis Anangonó (born April 13, 1989) is an Ecuadorian footballer who plays a striker.

Club career

Barcelona SC
His professional debut came in a 1–0 defeat against Universidad Católica, on February 16, 2008. He would finish his debut season with 10 games played, and 0 goals scored. He would continue his scoreless run into the 2009 season. His first career goal would come in a 1–0 win over Olmedo on February 28, 2010. He finishes the season with 8 goals in 28 league matches. After an unpromising start he was sent to play for El Nacional.

El Nacional

2011 season
Juan's debut match for El Nacional was on a 2–1 loss against L.D.U. Loja on January 29. His first goal with El Nacional came on February 20, in a 1–0 win over Imbabura. He played 45 league matches and scored 22 goals during the remainder of the 2011 season, including an away goal against L.D.U. Quito which qualified El Nacional for the qualifying rounds of the 2012 Copa Libertadores.

2012 season
His first goal of the 2012 season came on 23 May, on a 3–1 win against Macara. After scoring 8 goals in 28 matches, it was reported that he would be sold to Italian side Chievo Verona. The deal failed to fall through in time, so he was loaned to Argentine Primera A giants Argentinos Juniors.

Argentinos Juniors
He was loaned to Argentinos Juniors for 1 season due to the Chievo Verona deal not being completed in time. Though it has been reported that El Nacional still wished to deal with the Italian club by the January Transfer Window. Anangono made his debut in a 1–1 home draw against Boca Juniors, coming in as a substitute, and nearly scoring the winning goal. He made his second appearance in the club's derby versus All Boys, scoring the winning goal at the 88th minute, in a 1–0 away win. His next goal came in a thrilling 5–3 loss to Atlético de Rafaela, Anangono set up the first 2 goals and scored the 3rd goal.

Chicago Fire
Anangonó signed with Major League Soccer club Chicago Fire on July 23, 2013 as a designated player. Despite some eventual success including a diving header versus reigning Western Conference Champions Real Salt Lake, Anangono failed to make a lasting impact on the club.  He lost his starting spot to Quincy Amarikwa and failed to regain it in the remainder of his tenure in Chicago.

LDU Quito
On July 2, 2014, it was confirmed that Anangonó would be returning to his native Ecuador to play for L.D.U. Quito on loan for a year.

Beijing BSU
On 27 July 2019, Anangonó made the move to China League One side Beijing BSU.

International career

Anangonó made his debut for the Ecuador national football team in an international friendly against Chile coming in the 85th minute as a substitute for Jefferson Montero. He was capped once again in a 2014 World Cup Qualifier match against Argentina. He came in at the 88th minute for Joao Rojas. Anangonó has not been called up in over a year.

Career statistics
Statistics accurate as of match played 31 December 2019.

International goals
Scores and results list Ecuador's goal tally first.

Honours
LDU Quito
Ecuadorian Serie A: 2018

Comunicaciones 
CONCACAF League: 2021
Liga Nacional de Guatemala: Clausura 2022

Individual 
CONCACAF League Golden Ball: 2021
CONCACAF League Golden Boot: 2021

References

External links
FEF Player card

1989 births
Living people
People from Ibarra, Ecuador
Ecuador international footballers
Ecuadorian expatriate footballers
Ecuadorian footballers
Barcelona S.C. footballers
C.D. El Nacional footballers
Argentinos Juniors footballers
Chicago Fire FC players
L.D.U. Quito footballers
Leones Negros UdeG footballers
Beijing Sport University F.C. players
River Plate (Asunción) footballers
Club Blooming players
Ecuadorian Serie A players
Argentine Primera División players
Designated Players (MLS)
Major League Soccer players
Liga MX players
China League One players
Ecuadorian expatriate sportspeople in Argentina
Ecuadorian expatriate sportspeople in the United States
Ecuadorian expatriate sportspeople in Mexico
Ecuadorian expatriate sportspeople in China
Ecuadorian expatriate sportspeople in Paraguay
Expatriate footballers in Argentina
Expatriate soccer players in the United States
Expatriate footballers in Mexico
Expatriate footballers in China
Expatriate footballers in Paraguay
Association football forwards